Pepuza (or Pepouza, Greek: Πέπουζα) was an ancient town in Phrygia, Asia Minor (in today's district of Karahallı, Uşak Province, in Turkey's Aegean Region). Coordinates of the central terrasse of the settlement: UTM 35 S 0714926/4253954 (WGS-84), 38.408˚ N, 29.4615˚ E.  

From the middle of the 2nd century CE to the middle of the 6th century, Pepuza was the headquarters of the ancient Christian movement known as Montanism, which spread all over the Roman Empire. The Montanist patriarch resided at Pepouza, and the Montanists expected the heavenly Jerusalem to descend to earth at Pepouza and the nearby town of Tymion. In late antiquity, both places attracted crowds of pilgrims from all over the Roman Empire. Women played an emancipated role in Montanism, becoming priests and also bishops. In the 6th century, this movement became extinct.

Since 2001, Peter Lampe of the University of Heidelberg has directed annual archaeological campaigns in Phrygia, Turkey. During these interdisciplinary campaigns, together with William Tabbernee of Tulsa, numerous unknown ancient settlements were discovered and archaeologically documented. Two of them are the best candidates so far in the search for the identification of the two holy centers of ancient Montanism, Pepuza and Tymion. Scholars had searched for these lost sites since the 19th century.

The ancient settlement in the Karahallı area, near the village of Karayakuplu, discovered and identified as Pepuza by William Tabbernee and Peter Lampe, was settled continuously from Hellenistic times to Byzantine times. In Byzantine times, an important rock-cut monastery belonged to the town.

Literature

 W. Tabbernee/Peter Lampe, Pepouza and Tymion: The Discovery and Archaeological Exploration of a Lost Ancient City and an Imperial Estate (deGruyter: Berlin/New York, 2008)  und 
 Peter Lampe, Die montanistischen Tymion und Pepouza im Lichte der neuen Tymioninschrift, in: Zeitschrift für Antikes Christentum 8 (2004) 498-512

External links
University of Heidelberg: The Discovery of Pepouza and Tymion
 Peter Lampe: "Zwischen Ekstase und Askese". In: "SpiegelOnline" 3.7.2010
Video clip

Archaeological sites in the Aegean Region
Roman sites in Turkey
Former populated places in Turkey
Geography of Uşak Province
History of Uşak
Karahallı District
Montanism